Udell Township is one of eighteen townships in Appanoose County, Iowa, United States. As of the 2010 census, its population was 343.

It was named for Dr. Nathan Udell, a pioneer settler.

Geography
According to the USGS, it contains five cemeteries: Clancy, Eaton, Fairview, Taylor and Unionville.

References

External links
 US-Counties.com
 City-Data.com

Townships in Appanoose County, Iowa
Townships in Iowa